Denmark competed at the 2002 Winter Olympics in Salt Lake City, United States.

Curling

Men's tournament

Group stage
Top four teams advanced to semi-finals.

|}

Contestants

Women's tournament

Group stage
Top four teams advanced to semi-finals.

|}

Contestants

Freestyle skiing

Women

References
Official Olympic Reports
 Olympic Winter Games 2002, full results by sports-reference.com

Nations at the 2002 Winter Olympics
2002 Winter Olympics
Winter Olympics